The Kudurru of Gula is a boundary stone (Kudurru) for the Babylonian goddess Gula. Gula is the goddess of healing. It is from the 14th century - 13th century BC Kassite Babylonia, and is located at the Louvre.

The Kudurru of Gula shows Gula seated on her chair with her dog adjacent. Another side of the kudurru has registers representing symbols of gods, and also sections of cuneiform text.

See also

Kudurru
Nintinugga

External links
Kudurru Image; Article
Kudurru Image; Article with "Kudurru of Gula".

References

Kudurru boundary stones
Gula, Kudurru of
Sculpture of the Ancient Near East